Dankovo is a rural locality (a selo) and the administrative center of Dankovskoye Rural Settlement, Kashirsky District, Voronezh Oblast, Russia. The population was 1,226 as of 2010. There are 14 streets.

Geography 
Dankovo is located 18 km southwest of Kashirskoye (the district's administrative centre) by road. Starina is the nearest rural locality.

References 

Rural localities in Kashirsky District, Voronezh Oblast